= Timonin =

Timonin (Russian: Тимонин) is a Russian masculine surname, its feminine counterpart is Timonina. It may refer to

- Julia Timonina (born 1984), Russian model, actress, television personality and pop singer
- Timur Timonin (born 1997), Russian football player
